Chisholm Trail Crossing Park, or simply Chisholm Trail Park, is a park in Round Rock, Texas, United States. The park was dedicated in 2003.

Texas artist Jim Thomas has been commissioned to complete a series of bronze sculptures for the park, including one depicting a resting longhorn as well as The Pioneer Woman, The Pioneer Boy, The Bell Steer, and Goin' to Water.

References

External links

 Chisholm Trail Crossing Park at City of Round Rock
 Chisholm Trail Commemorative Park at Thomas Studio and Foundry

2003 establishments in Texas
Parks in Texas
Round Rock, Texas